Lucian Cristian Cazan (born 25 December 1989 in Bucharest) is a Romanian football player who plays for Metaloglobus București. His father, Paul Cazan, was also a football player and a legend of Sportul Studenţesc.

Honours
Gaz Metan Mediaş
Liga II: 2015–16
FC Voluntari
Cupa României: 2016–17
Supercupa României: 2017

References

External links
 Profile on Sportul Studenţesc official site
 
 

1989 births
Living people
Footballers from Bucharest
Romanian footballers
Association football defenders
Liga I players
Liga II players
FC Sportul Studențesc București players
ASA 2013 Târgu Mureș players
CSM Ceahlăul Piatra Neamț players
CS Gaz Metan Mediaș players
FC Voluntari players
FC Petrolul Ploiești players
FC Metaloglobus București players